Frederick Pryor may refer to:

 Frederic Pryor (1933–2019), American economist
 Frederick Pryor (cricketer) (1844–?), English cricketer